Building at 423 West Baltimore Street is a historic retail and wholesale building located at Baltimore, Maryland, United States. It is a five-story loft structure of the Queen Anne style.  It achieved its present configuration in 1893, as the result of extensive alteration of an existing three-story brick warehouse. The storefront retains its important cast-iron elements, and the upper floors are essentially unchanged.

Building at 423 West Baltimore Street was listed on the National Register of Historic Places in 1995.

References

External links
, including photo from 1987, at Maryland Historical Trust

Cast-iron architecture in Baltimore
Commercial buildings on the National Register of Historic Places in Baltimore
Commercial buildings completed in 1893
Downtown Baltimore
Queen Anne architecture in Maryland
1893 establishments in Maryland